Hamid Reza Assefi was born in Tehran, Iran. Spokesman, Vice Minister of Parliamentary and Consular Affairs and Communication, and the Special Assistant to the Minister at the Iranian Ministry of Foreign Affairs under President Khatami.

He was an ambassador of Iran during 1994 till 1998. He was also Ambassador of Iran to France during the 1998 World Cup where he gave the Iranian fans flags and posters of the Iranian national football team.

On 12 February 2006, he stated that "I believe the crimes committed by the Zionist regime are greater than the Holocaust. Unfortunately, the Zionist regime is blackmailing the Europeans with the Holocaust."

Speaking about Baghdad bridge stampede that occurred on 31 August 2005 when up to 1,000 people died he said: "[Iran offers its] condolences and sympathy with the Iraqi people and government. Suspicious hands are involved in conspiracies to incite violence and bloodshed among the different Iraqi groups and tribes so that they disturb the security and calm of the Iraqi people"

He was Iran's ambassador to the United Arab Emirates.

References

External links
 Ministry of Foreign Affairs latest news
 Iran defames Holocaust suffering, from the Jewish Telegraphic Agency

Iranian Vice Ministers
Iranian diplomats
Living people
People from Mashhad
Ambassadors of Iran to France
Ambassadors of Iran to the United Arab Emirates
Iranian people of Iraqi descent
Spokespersons for the Ministry of Foreign Affairs of Iran
Year of birth missing (living people)